Nothophantes, the horrid ground-weaver, is a critically endangered monotypic genus of European dwarf spiders containing the single species, Nothophantes horridus. The genus name comes from the Ancient Greek  (nothos), meaning "spurious", and hyphantes, meaning "weaver". The species name comes from the Latin horridus, meaning "bristly".

Description
Shapter's Field Quarry, the species' type locality, has since been developed by builders and is now the Plymouth Trade Park industrial estate. Its small size and habit of living deep inside cracks and crevices of rocks makes them difficult to find.

History
It was first discovered in 1995, then not again until 1999. Until 2016 only nine specimens have ever been found, of which seven were female and two male. It was photographed for the first time at a fourth site in 2016.  In September 2011, Nothophantes horridus was one of the subjects of BBC Radio 4’s Saving Species programme.

Threats
In 2014, plans by Wainhomes (South West) Holdings Ltd. to build homes in Radford Quarry were rejected by Plymouth City Council, and it was appealed, triggering a formal planning inquiry.

In 2015, an online petition to save Nothophantes horridus from extinction was started by the conservation group Buglife, and was signed by almost 10,000 people. Money was raised through crowdsourcing to fund further research into the species, totaling nearly £10,500. In June, the IUCN rated the spider as critically endangered, adding it to the global Red List of Threatened Species. On June 9, the Planning Inspector rejected the building development because of concern for the rare wildlife, and notably Nothophantes horridus.

References

External links
 Species description

Critically endangered animals
Environment of Devon
IUCN Red List critically endangered species
Linyphiidae
Monotypic Araneomorphae genera
Plymouth, Devon
Spiders of Europe